In mathematical analysis, Lipschitz continuity, named after German mathematician Rudolf Lipschitz, is a strong form of uniform continuity for functions. Intuitively, a Lipschitz continuous function is limited in how fast it can change: there exists a real number such that, for every pair of points on the graph of this function, the absolute value of the slope of the line connecting them is not greater than this real number; the smallest such bound is called the Lipschitz constant of the function (or modulus of uniform continuity). For instance, every function that has bounded first derivatives is Lipschitz continuous.

In the theory of differential equations, Lipschitz continuity is the central condition of the Picard–Lindelöf theorem which guarantees the existence and uniqueness of the solution to an initial value problem. A special type of Lipschitz continuity, called contraction, is used in the Banach fixed-point theorem.

We have the following chain of strict inclusions for functions over a closed and bounded non-trivial interval of the real line:

 Continuously differentiable ⊂ Lipschitz continuous ⊂ -Hölder continuous,

where . We also have

 Lipschitz continuous ⊂ absolutely continuous ⊂ uniformly continuous.

Definitions 
Given two metric spaces (X, dX) and (Y, dY), where dX denotes the metric on the set X and dY is the metric on set Y, a function f : X → Y is called Lipschitz continuous if there exists a real constant K ≥ 0 such that, for all x1 and x2 in X,

Any  such K is referred to as  a Lipschitz constant for the function f and f may also be referred to as K-Lipschitz. The smallest constant is sometimes called the (best) Lipschitz constant of f or the dilation or dilatation of f. If K = 1 the function is called a short map, and if 0 ≤ K < 1 and f maps a metric space to itself, the function is called a contraction.

In particular, a real-valued function f : R → R is called Lipschitz continuous if there exists a positive real constant K such that, for all real x1 and x2,

In this case, Y is the set of real numbers R with the standard metric dY(y1, y2) = |y1 − y2|, and X is a subset of R.

In general, the inequality is (trivially) satisfied if x1 = x2. Otherwise, one can equivalently define a function to be Lipschitz continuous if and only if there exists a constant K ≥ 0 such that, for all x1 ≠ x2,  

For real-valued functions of several real variables, this holds if and only if the absolute value of the slopes of all secant lines are bounded by K.  The set of lines of slope K passing through a point on the graph of the function forms a circular cone, and a function is Lipschitz if and only if the graph of the function everywhere lies completely outside of this cone (see figure).

A function is called locally Lipschitz continuous if for every x in X there exists a neighborhood U of x such that f restricted to U is Lipschitz continuous.  Equivalently, if X is a locally compact metric space, then f is locally Lipschitz if and only if it is Lipschitz continuous on every compact subset of X.  In spaces that are not locally compact, this is a necessary but not a sufficient condition.

More generally, a function f defined on X is said to be Hölder continuous or to satisfy a Hölder condition of order α > 0 on X if there exists a constant M ≥ 0 such that
 
for all x and y in X. Sometimes a Hölder condition of order α is also called a uniform Lipschitz condition of order α > 0.

For a real number K ≥ 1, if

then f is called K-bilipschitz (also written K-bi-Lipschitz). We say f is bilipschitz or bi-Lipschitz to mean there exists such a K. A bilipschitz mapping is injective, and is in fact a homeomorphism onto its image.  A bilipschitz function is the same thing as an injective Lipschitz function whose inverse function is also Lipschitz.

Examples
Lipschitz continuous functions that are everywhere differentiable
Lipschitz continuous functions that are not everywhere differentiable
Lipschitz continuous functions that are everywhere differentiable but not continuously differentiable
Continuous functions that are not (globally) Lipschitz continuous
Differentiable functions that are not (locally) Lipschitz continuous
Analytic functions that are not (globally) Lipschitz continuous

Properties
An everywhere differentiable function g : R → R is Lipschitz continuous (with K = sup |g′(x)|) if and only if it has bounded first derivative; one direction follows from the mean value theorem. In particular, any continuously differentiable function is locally Lipschitz, as continuous functions are locally bounded so its gradient is locally bounded as well.
A Lipschitz function g : R → R is absolutely continuous and therefore is differentiable almost everywhere, that is, differentiable at every point outside a set of Lebesgue measure zero.  Its derivative is essentially bounded in magnitude by the Lipschitz constant, and for a < b, the difference g(b) − g(a) is equal to the integral of the derivative g′ on the interval [a, b].
Conversely, if f : I → R is absolutely continuous and thus differentiable almost everywhere, and satisfies |f′(x)| ≤ K for almost all x in I, then f is Lipschitz continuous with Lipschitz constant at most K.
More generally, Rademacher's theorem extends the differentiability result to Lipschitz mappings between Euclidean spaces: a Lipschitz map f : U → Rm, where U is an open set in Rn, is almost everywhere differentiable. Moreover, if K is the best Lipschitz constant of f, then  whenever the total derivative Df exists. 
If the domain  is convex then in fact .
Suppose that {fn} is a sequence of Lipschitz continuous mappings between two metric spaces, and that all fn have Lipschitz constant bounded by some K.  If fn converges to a mapping f uniformly, then f is also Lipschitz, with Lipschitz constant bounded by the same K.  In particular, this implies that the set of real-valued functions on a compact metric space with a particular bound for the Lipschitz constant is a closed and convex subset of the Banach space of continuous functions.  This result does not hold for sequences in which the functions may have unbounded Lipschitz constants, however.  In fact, the space of all Lipschitz functions on a compact metric space is a subalgebra of the Banach space of continuous functions, and thus dense in it, an elementary consequence of the Stone–Weierstrass theorem (or as a consequence of Weierstrass approximation theorem, because every polynomial is locally Lipschitz continuous).
Every Lipschitz continuous map is uniformly continuous, and hence a fortiori continuous. More generally, a set of functions with bounded Lipschitz constant forms an  equicontinuous set.  The Arzelà–Ascoli theorem implies that if {fn} is a uniformly bounded sequence of functions with bounded Lipschitz constant, then it has a convergent subsequence.  By the result of the previous paragraph, the limit function is also Lipschitz, with the same bound for the Lipschitz constant.  In particular the set of all real-valued Lipschitz functions on a compact metric space X having Lipschitz constant ≤ K  is a locally compact convex subset of the Banach space C(X).
For a family of Lipschitz continuous functions fα with common constant, the function  (and ) is Lipschitz continuous as well, with the same Lipschitz constant, provided it assumes a finite value at least at a point. 
If U is a subset of the metric space M and f : U → R is a Lipschitz continuous function, there always exist Lipschitz continuous maps M → R which extend f and have the same Lipschitz constant as f (see also Kirszbraun theorem). An extension is provided by 
 
where k is  a Lipschitz constant for f on U.

Lipschitz manifolds
A Lipschitz structure on a topological manifold is defined using an atlas of charts whose transition maps are bilipschitz; this is possible because bilipschitz maps form a pseudogroup.

is locally Lipschitz.

This structure is intermediate between that of a piecewise-linear manifold and a topological manifold: a PL structure gives rise to a unique Lipschitz structure.  While Lipschitz manifolds are closely related to topological manifolds, Rademacher's theorem allows one to do analysis, yielding various applications.

One-sided Lipschitz
Let F(x) be an upper semi-continuous function of x, and that F(x) is a closed, convex set for all x. Then F is one-sided Lipschitz if
 
for some C and for all x1 and x2.

It is possible that the function F could have a very large Lipschitz constant but a moderately sized, or even negative, one-sided Lipschitz constant. For example, the function

has Lipschitz constant K = 50 and a one-sided Lipschitz constant C = 0. An example which is one-sided Lipschitz but not Lipschitz continuous is F(x) = e−x, with C = 0.

See also

 
 Dini continuity
 Modulus of continuity
 Quasi-isometry
 Johnson-Lindenstrauss lemma – For any integer n≥0, any finite subset X⊆Rn, and any real number 0<ε<1, there exists a (1+ε)-bi-Lipschitz function  where

References

 
Structures on manifolds